General Ramsay may refer to:

Alan Ramsay (1895–1973), Australian Army major general
Anders Edvard Ramsay (1799–1877), Finnish-born Russian Imperial Army General of the Finnish Guards' Rifle Battalion 
Angus Ramsay (born 1946), British Army major general
Charles Ramsay (British Army officer, born 1936) (1936–2017), British Army major general
Frank William Ramsay (1875–1954) British Army major general
George Ramsay (English Army officer) (1652–1705), Scottish lieutenant general
George D. Ramsay (1802–1882), U.S. Army brigadier general
Henry Ramsay (Indian Army officer) (1816–1893), British Indian Army general
Mark F. Ramsay (born c. 1958), U.S. Air Force lieutenant general
George Ramsay, 9th Earl of Dalhousie (1770–1838), British Army general

See also
Ambrose Ramsey (died 1805),  Hillsborough District Brigade brigadier general